Nancy Lonsdorf is an American author and medical doctor who practices Maharishi Ayurveda. She received her training at Johns Hopkins School of Medicine and studied Ayurveda in Europe and India, and is the author of several books on the subject.

Education
Lonsdorf received her M.D. from Johns Hopkins School of Medicine in 1983 and performed her residency training in psychiatry at Stanford University. Lonsdorf has also studied with Ayurvedic physicians in India, Europe and the U.S.

Career
The Chicago Tribune has referred to Lonsdorf as "one of the nation's most prominent Ayurvedic doctors". She has been a speaker at various medical schools including the Columbia University College of Physicians and Surgeons, the Georgetown University Medical Center, the Johns Hopkins School of Medicine, the George Washington University School of Medicine, Howard University, and the Uniformed Services University of the Health Sciences.

She is a member of the planning team for the College of Perfect Health at Maharishi University of Management, which plans to grant M.D. and M.S. degrees during a 5-year educational program. She is a contributing editor for Natural Solutions (formerly called Alternative Medicine) magazine and a member of the Scientific Board of Advisors for RateADrug.com. She teaches courses in clinical Ayurveda to health professionals through the Scripps Center for Integrative Medicine in La Jolla, California.

Londsorf reports that she sees "12 patients or less per day" and according to the "Ask The Doctors" web site, has treated more than 10,000 patients since 1986. She says "the great majority of our patients are professionals"  including one profiled by author and physician, Andrew Weil.

In 1987, Lonsdorf became the medical director for the Maharishi Ayurveda Medical Center in Washington, D.C. and in 2000, she became the medical director for The Raj Ayurveda Health Center in Maharishi Vedic City, Iowa, a position she held until 2005. In 2011, she received the "Atreya Award for Excellence in Ayurvedic Practice" from the Association of Ayurvedic Professionals of North America, (AAPNA).

Lonsdorf has been featured or cited in a number of periodicals including the Vegetarian Times, Washingtonian (magazine), The Chicago Tribune, LA Times, the Yoga Journal, Redbook magazine, Rodale's Yogalife, FIT magazine, Natural Health, and Women's Health. Lonsdorf has also appeared on National Public Radio, Voice of America, TV-MD (PBS), the Geraldo Rivera show, CNN and The Donahue Show.

Publications
Lonsdorf has authored several books and videos on Maharishi Ayurveda and its relationship to women's health.

Books
 
Lonsdorf, Nancy; Butler, Veronica and Brown, Melanie (2001)	Ayurveda für Frauen Gesundheit, Glück und langes Leben durch indische Medizin Language: German, Publisher: München Droemer Knaur 
Lonsdorf, Nancy (2002)  2002A woman's best medicine for menopause : your personal guide to radiant good health using Maharishi Ayurveda, Chicago: Contemporary Books
Lonsdorf, Nancy; Brown, Melanie and Butler, Veronica (2002) Nejlepší medicína pro ženy : zdraví, štěstí a dlouhověkost za pomoci Maharišiho ájurvédy Language: Czech, Publisher: Praha : Dobra,

Lonsdorf, Nancy (2008) Zralá žena : menopauza a ájurvéda : přirozená cesta ke zdraví, kráse a harmonii Language: Czech, Publisher: Praha : Triton, 2008

Videography
Lonsdorf, Nancy (1988) On creating health : eliminating stress and reversing aging Maharishi Ayur-Veda Association of America.; Global Video Productions, Publisher: Lancaster, MA : Global Video Productions
Lonsdorf, Nancy; Bassick, Jane;  Guth, Jamie; Weil, Andrew; Northrup, Christiane and Kronenberg, Fredi (1995) Alternative health (medicine), Publisher: Sherborn, MA: Aquarius Productions, Inc.

References

External links 
 Maharishi Ayurveda natural medicine for women's health and beauty  Official web site

American psychiatrists
American women writers
Living people
Ayurvedacharyas
Year of birth missing (living people)
21st-century American women